The 2006 Finn Open European Championship was held at the Club de Vela Palamós in Palamós, Spain between September 22 and September 30, 2006.

Results

|}

^ Top 10 qualified for medals race, resulting in a lower score for 11th placed Cook.

External links
Official website

2006 in sailing
Yacht
Finn European Championships
Sailing competitions in Spain